The Feminine Touch (also called The November Conspiracy) is a 1995 direct-to-video thriller film directed by Conrad Janis. It stars Paige Turco as Jennifer Barron, a woman who is targeted after her boyfriend is assassinated leaving secret documents in her possession.

Plot
Jenny Baron (Paige Turco) is a beautiful investigative reporter swept into a deadly conspiracy that reaches to the highest levels of the government. When she is assigned to get the story of charismatic Presidential candidate Senator Ashton (George Segal), her job is complicated by a string of political assassinations and attempts. After her lover (Dirk Benedict) is killed, things get personal. Jenny finds herself in possession of a computer disk that holds a list of powerful politicians marked for elimination, and the key to the massive web of death and deceit —— and now she's next on the list of targets! Pursued by hitmen and hunted by police, if she survives, she may discover a truth she's not prepared to accept.

Cast
 Paige Turco as Jennifer Barron
 Dirk Benedict as John Mackie
 George Segal as Senator 'Beau' Ashton
 Elliott Gould as Senator George M. Kahn
 Conrad Janis as Frank Donaldsonn
 Bo Hopkins as Captain Hogan
 Lois Nettleton as Pigeon
 Maria Grimm as Maria de la Luz Schultz

Release
The film has only been released in VHS format as of February 4, 2012.

References

External links 
 
 
 

1995 direct-to-video films
1995 films
American thriller films
1995 thriller films
1990s English-language films
1990s American films